The 2023–24 DFB-Pokal will be the 81st season of the annual German football cup competition. Sixty-four teams will participate in the competition, including all teams from the previous year's Bundesliga and 2. Bundesliga. The competition will begin on 11 August 2023 with the first of six rounds and will end on 25 May 2024 with the final at the Olympiastadion in Berlin, a nominally neutral venue, which has hosted the final since 1985. The DFB-Pokal is considered the second-most important club title in German football after the Bundesliga championship. The DFB-Pokal is run by the German Football Association (DFB).

The winner of the DFB-Pokal earns automatic qualification for the group stage of the 2024–25 edition of the UEFA Europa League. If they have already qualified for the UEFA Champions League through position in the Bundesliga, then the spot will go to the team in sixth, and the league's UEFA Europa Conference League play-off round spot will go to the team in seventh. The winner also will host the 2024 edition of the DFL-Supercup at the start of the next season, and will face the champion of the 2023–24 Bundesliga.

Participating clubs
The following teams qualified for the competition:

Format

Participation
The DFB-Pokal begins with a round of 64 teams. The 36 teams of the Bundesliga and 2. Bundesliga, along with the top 4 finishers of the 3. Liga are automatically qualified for the tournament. Of the remaining slots, 21 are given to the cup winners of the regional football associations, the Verbandspokal. The three remaining slots are given to the three regional associations with the most men's teams, which currently is Bavaria, Lower Saxony and Westphalia. The best-placed amateur team of the Regionalliga Bayern is given the spot for Bavaria. For Lower Saxony, the Lower Saxony Cup is split into two paths: one for 3. Liga and Regionalliga Nord teams, and the other for amateur teams. The winners of each path qualify. For Westphalia, the spot is rotated each season between the best-placed Westphalian team of the Regionalliga West and the best-placed amateur team of the Oberliga Westfalen. For the 2023–24 DFB-Pokal, this spot was awarded to a team from the Regionalliga. As every team is entitled to participate in local tournaments which qualify for the association cups, every team can in principle compete in the DFB-Pokal. Reserve teams and combined football sections are not permitted to enter, along with no two teams of the same association or corporation.

Draw
The draws for the different rounds are conducted as following:

For the first round, the participating teams will be split into two pots of 32 teams each. The first pot contains all teams which have qualified through their regional cup competitions, the best four teams of the 3. Liga, and the bottom four teams of the 2. Bundesliga. Every team from this pot will be drawn to a team from the second pot, which contains all remaining professional teams (all the teams of the Bundesliga and the remaining fourteen 2. Bundesliga teams). The teams from the first pot will be set as the home team in the process.

The two-pot scenario will also be applied for the second round, with the remaining 3. Liga and/or amateur team(s) in the first pot and the remaining Bundesliga and 2. Bundesliga teams in the other pot. Once again, the 3. Liga and/or amateur team(s) will serve as hosts. This time the pots do not have to be of equal size though, depending on the results of the first round. Theoretically, it is even possible that there may be only one pot, if all of the teams from one of the pots from the first round beat all the others in the second pot. Once one pot is empty, the remaining pairings will be drawn from the other pot with the first-drawn team for a match serving as hosts.

For the remaining rounds, the draw will be conducted from just one pot. Any remaining 3. Liga and/or amateur team(s) will be the home team if drawn against a professional team. In every other case, the first-drawn team will serve as hosts.

Match rules
Teams meet in one game per round. Matches take place for 90 minutes, with two halves of 45 minutes. If still tied after regulation, 30 minutes of extra time will be played, consisting of two periods of 15 minutes. If the score is still level after this, the match will be decided by a penalty shoot-out. A coin toss will decide who takes the first penalty. A maximum of nine players can be listed on the substitute bench, while a maximum of five substitutions are allowed. However, each team is only given three opportunities to make substitutions, with a fourth opportunity in extra time, excluding substitutions made at half-time, before the start of extra time and at half-time in extra time. From the round of 16 onward, a video assistant referee will be appointed for all DFB-Pokal matches. Though technically possible, VAR will not be used for home matches of Bundesliga clubs prior to the round of 16 in order to provide a uniform approach to all matches.

Suspensions
If a player receives five yellow cards in the competition, he will then be suspended from the next cup match. Similarly, receiving a second yellow card suspends a player from the next cup match. If a player receives a direct red card, they will be suspended a minimum of one match, but the German Football Association reserves the right to increase the suspension.

International qualification
The winner of the DFB-Pokal earns automatic qualification for the group stage of next year's edition of the UEFA Europa League. If they have already qualified for the UEFA Champions League through position in the Bundesliga, then the spot will go to the team in sixth, and the league's UEFA Europa Conference League play-off round spot will go to the team in seventh. The winner also will host the DFL-Supercup at the start of the next season, and will face the champion of the previous year's Bundesliga, unless the same team wins the Bundesliga and the DFB-Pokal, completing a double. In that case, the runner up of the Bundesliga will take the spot and host instead.

Schedule

All draws will generally be held on a Sunday evening after each round (unless noted otherwise).

The rounds of the 2023–24 competition are scheduled as follows:

Matches
A total of sixty-three matches will take place, starting with the first round on 11 August 2023 and culminating with the final on 25 May 2024 at the Olympiastadion in Berlin.

Times up to 28 October 2023 and from 31 March 2024 are CEST (UTC+2). Times from 29 October 2023 to 30 March 2024 are CET (UTC+1).

First round
The draw for the first round will be held in 2023. Thirty of the thirty-two matches will take place from 11 to 14 August 2023. The remaining two matches, involving the participants of the 2023 DFL-Supercup (played on 12 August), will take place from 26 to 27 September 2023.

Notes

References

External links
 
DFB-Pokal on kicker.de 

2024-24
2023–24 in German football cups